Nossa Senhora dos Remédios  (Portuguese for Our Lady of Remedies) is a parish in the municipality of Povoação in the Azores. The population in 2011 was 1,112, in an area of 12.78 km².

References

Freguesias of Povoação, Azores